Mucilaginibacter sabulilitoris is a Gram-negative, strictly aerobic, non-spore-forming and rod-shaped bacterium from the genus of Mucilaginibacter which has been isolated from marine sand.

References

External links
Type strain of Mucilaginibacter sabulilitoris at BacDive -  the Bacterial Diversity Metadatabase

Sphingobacteriia
Bacteria described in 2013